Hong Kong Academic Aptitude Test (HKAAT) was a standardised, area-wide benchmarking examination conducted by the Education Department. It was normally taken by students who finished primary sixth-grade education in Hong Kong. It was canceled in 2000.

History
The test was designed to create a common ground in measuring different school systems and began in 1978 as part of the Secondary School Places Allocation (SSPA) scheme. HKAAT aimed to test student logic, reasoning, and classification ability.

References

Education in Hong Kong